Clinton Township is a township in Wayne County, Iowa, USA.

History
Clinton Township is named for DeWitt Clinton.

References

Townships in Wayne County, Iowa
Townships in Iowa